Metropark Hotel Causeway Bay Hong Kong was a four-star Hotel in Causeway Bay, Wan Chai District, Hong Kong. It was located on 148 Tung Lo Wan Road. The hotel was close to Tin Hau station with 33 floors and 266 rooms. The hotel opened in 2002 and was owned by China Travel Service.

On 8 July 2020, the Office for Safeguarding National Security of the CPG in the HKSAR was established in the hotel's building. It is unclear whether the office will be temporary or permanent, with the hotel stating they would not be taking bookings for the next six months.

Facilities 
The hotel had Wi-Fi, a gymnasium, restaurants, bars, and a rooftop pool with a view of Victoria Harbour. Furthermore, the hotel had a free shuttle service to Hong Kong Convention and Exhibition Centre and the shopping malls of Causeway Bay. A cross boundary coaches bus stop is next to the hotel, which provides coaches to the Guangdong Province of the Mainland of China

Restaurants 
 Vic's (Bar)
 Binfen Wei Yuan Restaurant

References

Hotels in Hong Kong
2002 establishments in Hong Kong
Hotels established in 2002
Intelligence agency headquarters
Government buildings completed in 2002